Graeme Bryce Segal FRS (born 21 December 1941) is an Australian mathematician, and professor at the University of Oxford.

Biography
Segal was educated at the University of Sydney, where he received his BSc degree in 1961. He went on to receive his D.Phil. in 1967 from St Catherine's College, Oxford; his thesis, written under the supervision of Michael Atiyah, was titled Equivariant K-theory.

His thesis was in the area of equivariant K-theory. The Atiyah–Segal completion theorem in that subject was a major motivation for the Segal conjecture, which he formulated.  He has made many other contributions to homotopy theory in the past four decades, including an approach to infinite loop spaces.  He was also a pioneer of elliptic cohomology, which is related to his interest in topological quantum field theory.

Segal was an Invited Speaker at the ICM in 1970 in Nice and in 1990 in Kyoto. He was elected a Fellow of the Royal Society in 1982 and an Emeritus Fellow of All Souls College, Oxford.
He was awarded the Sylvester Medal by the Royal Society in 2010.

He was Lowndean Professor of Astronomy and Geometry from 1990 to 1999.

Segal was elected the President of the London Mathematical Society in 2011.

He is married to writer, Marina Warner.  They live in London.

Books
 Loop Groups (Oxford Mathematical Monographs). New ed. Clarendon Press, Oxford 2003,  (with Andrew Pressley).
 Lectures on Lie groups and Lie algebras (London Mathematical Society Student texts Vol. 32). 5th ed. Cambridge University Press, Cambridge 2006,  (with Ian G. Macdonald and Roger Carter).

References

External links
 Dr Graeme Segal FRS , Mathematical Institute, University of Oxford
 
 Topology, Geometry and Quantum Field Theory. Proceedings of the 2002 Oxford Symposium in Honour of the 60th Birthday of Graeme Segal.

1942 births
Living people
University of Sydney alumni
Alumni of St Catherine's College, Oxford
20th-century British mathematicians
21st-century British mathematicians
Topologists
Fellows of All Souls College, Oxford
Fellows of St John's College, Cambridge
Cambridge mathematicians
Fellows of the Royal Society
Institute for Advanced Study visiting scholars
Lowndean Professors of Astronomy and Geometry
Presidents of the London Mathematical Society